Kim Min-gwi is a South Korean actor and model. He is known best known for his roles in dramas such as L.U.C.A.: The Beginning, She Would Never Know, Narco-Saints and Nevertheless.

Biography and career
He joined Big Picture Entertainment and made his debut as a model in 2017 and appeared in a number of modeling show: Seoul Fashion Week Dohn Hann, Sewing Boundaries, Discovery, Ordinary People, Greedilous and Anyoung, Holynumber7, Solidhomm. He also appeared in magazines GQ, Dyed and Cosmopolitan along with that he also appeared in music videos of Senozzi and WELL. He also did modeling for clothing brands such as Musinsa, Songjio Homme, and Wonder Place and he also appeared in commercials such as NH Investment & Securities, Hyundai Motor Company, and Naver Music. He made his acting debut in 2021, he appeared in She Would Never Know as a model and later he appeared in L.U.C.A.: The Beginning as Kim Tae-oh and Nevertheless as Nam Kyu-hyun. He also starred in movie Whispering Corridors 6: The Humming.

Personal life
On May 31, 2021, it was revealed that Kim Min-gwi had tested positive for COVID-19. He has gone into self-quarantine, halting all activities after coming in close contact with someone who had COVID-19 and recently tested positive for the virus.

Filmography

Television series

Film

Music video

Awards and nominations

References

External links
 
 

1994 births
Living people
21st-century South Korean male actors
South Korean male film actors
South Korean male models
South Korean male television actors